This is a listing of official releases by Ziggy Marley, a Jamaican singer and musician from 2003–present.  Marley started his musical career with some of his brothers and sisters as the Melody Makers in the 1980s; he performed and recorded albums with them from 1983–2001. The discography of his recordings with the Melody Makers is elsewhere.

His first solo album, Dragonfly, was released in 2003, and followed by Love Is My Religion in 2006. Love is My Religion won the 2007 Grammy for Best Reggae Album. In 2009, Marley released his third album Family Time. Family Time won the 2010 Grammy for Best Musical Album for Children.

Albums

Studio albums

Live

Compilations

Soundtrack appearances
2011: Beat the World

Singles
 2003: "True to Myself"
 2003: "Dragonfly"
 2003: "Rainbow in the Sky"
 2006: "Love Is My Religion"
 2006: "Into the Groove"
 2006: "A Lifetime"
 2009: "Family Time"
 2009: "I Love You Too"
 2009: "ABC"
 2010: "Africa Land"
 2011: "Jammin' in the Rain"
 2011: "Jamaica in My Head"
 2011: "Forward to Love"

As featured artist
 2014: "Love" (Cody Simpson feat. Ziggy Marley)

Video releases

References

External links
 

Discographies of Jamaican artists
Rhythm and blues discographies
Reggae discographies